Marmashen Monastery is a 10th-century Armenian monastic complex consisting of five churches near the village of Marmashen in the Shirak Province of Armenia. The buildings at Marmashen are very similar in style to those of Khtzkonk Monastery.

It was built by Vahram Pahlavouni.

Gallery

References

Bibliography

External links 
 VirtualAni.org: Monastery of Marmashen
 Rensselaer Digital Collections: Marmashen Monastery
 TravelGyumri.com: Marmashen Monastery

Armenian Apostolic monasteries in Armenia
Oriental Orthodox congregations established in the 10th century
Christian monasteries established in the 10th century
Buildings and structures in Shirak Province